Scarlotta Valentine but known as Scarlett Valentine is a fictional character on the New Zealand soap opera Shortland Street. She was portrayed from 2004 to 2008 by Nicole Thomson.

Character history

Arrival in Ferndale
Scarlett Valentine is the daughter of the Head of Shortland Street's former Emergency Department, Craig Valentine and sister to teenage rebel, Jake Valentine.

Scarlett first appeared as an awkward teenager, more interested in cricket and books than make-up and boys. Moving to Ferndale wasn't easy for her and she was bullied mercilessly, but eventually saw off the bully, and settled into her new life.

She doesn't make friends easily and Scarlett's best friend has been her dad. She is certainly the woman of the Valentine household, a result of growing up without her mother.

Family history revealed
Scarlett was only a baby when her mother Paula abandoned her, her older brother Jake, and Craig.  Craig has never discussed the end of his marriage with his children, but when Paula turned up a few Christmas' ago with Craig's brother Brett, Scarlett endured the agony of testing to discover if she was truly Craig's child - or Brett's. The incident brought her even closer to her Craig when her parentage was settled once and for all.

Eti Kawaka
Eventually, she did find a new friend in Eti Kawaka, Tama's cousin from up north. Inexperienced and shy, his and Scarlett's friendship blossomed into boyfriend and girlfriend, but in the most innocent way. Following the 2005 car crash that killed Norman Hanson, Eti was injured and they briefly broke up, this led to a brief flirtation with Eti's rugby mate Jimmi. Eti and Scarlett broke up in early 2006.

TK Samuels
But Daddy's girl is growing into a woman, and 2006 was the year Scarlett emerged as her own person. Her crush on TK Samuels, cousin of Huia Samuels was the catalyst for a whole new side of Scarlett to emerge, as teenage hormones took over this sweet, compliant girl.

Huia Samuels and Sarah Potts
Dad Craig turned Scarlett's world upside down by dumping Scarlett's friend and confidante, the caring Huia - and taking up with flighty fellow doctor Sarah Potts. Scarlett was miserable and Craig's subsequent grief over Huia's death left her feeling even more alone. Best mate Eti moved to Japan and Scarlett found herself floundering.

Tormented by the McKays
The arrival of the siblings Sophie and Hunter McKay gave Scarlett some hope that she had found a new group of friends. But after a summer fling with Hunter ended abruptly, Scarlett was left feeling more alone and confused than ever. The McKays quickly turned from friends to enemies, and it built to a head in April 2007 when Scarlett took Craig's car and rammed it into a terrified Hunter in the school yard. After the incident with Hunter, Scarlett moved to Australia to live with her mother Paula and brother Jake.

Standing trial
Scarlett returned from Australia for her trial for driving a vehicle at Hunter McKay.  The court was told that Scarlett had been subjected to abuse by fellow students including Sophie McKay and her brother.  Scarlett's brief relationship was also told.  The court discharged her and Scarlett was able to return to Perth.

Murder of Craig
In September 2008, Scarlett's father Craig was murdered by a corrupt pharmaceutical company known as Scott Spear. Scarlett did not appear on screen but was talked to on the phone by Chris. This was likely the last of Scarlett seeing as Craig is no longer on the show.

References

External links
Scarlett Valentine's Profile
Street Talk Profile

Valentine, Scarlett
Valentine, Scarlett
Valentine, Scarlett